Ceferino Estrada (26 August 1945 – 24 November 2003) was a Mexican cyclist. He competed in the team time trial event at the 1976 Summer Olympics.

References

External links
 

1945 births
2003 deaths
Mexican male cyclists
Olympic cyclists of Mexico
Cyclists at the 1976 Summer Olympics
Sportspeople from Guanajuato
People from Comonfort
Pan American Games medalists in cycling
20th-century Mexican people
21st-century Mexican people
Pan American Games gold medalists for Mexico
Medalists at the 1975 Pan American Games